The Ethiopian ridgeback agama  (Xenagama zonura), is a species of lizard in the family Agamidae. The species is endemic to the Horn of Africa. It is among the largest species of Xenagama, with snout-to-vent length of males up to 84.5mm.

Geographic range 
X. zonura is endemic to Ethiopia, in elevations between 2000 and 2500m. Comparatively to other Xenagama species, X. zonura resides at higher elevations.

Reproduction 
X. zonura is oviparous.

References 

Reptiles described in 1895
Taxa named by George Albert Boulenger
zonura